The Personal Submersibles Organization (PSUBS) is an internet based society for hobbyists interested in small privately owned manned or unmanned submarines.

History 
In 1996,  sporadic discussions about submarines in the rec.boats.building electronic newsgroup were moved to private email between four primary participants.   Jon Wallace and Ray Keefer, two original participants, decided to create a website and set up a listserver.   In February 1997 the first archiving of PSUBS discussions began with a total of six people registered.

In October 1997, the domain name PSUBS.ORG was secured for the organization.   Wallace and Keefer performed moderator duties and also provided technical expertise, plus funding, to keep the web server and listserver operating.  

In 2007 Wallace and Keefer incorporated the organization under the name PSUBS LLC. In 2009, PSUBS began offering formal memberships to participants .

References 
 Personal submarines on display Michigan Live, August 10, 2012, Dave Alexander
 Going Under on a Whim and some Air BoatU.S. Magazine, May 2008
 For Sub Hobbyists, Smugglers' Craft Is Merely Subpar Wall Street Journal, November 30, 2006, Jennifer Saranow
 Do-It-Yourself Ahoogah LA Times, April 6, 2004, Kimberly Lisagor
 Run Silent, Run Cheap Forbes Magazine, March 31, 2003, David Armstrong

External links 
 

Personal submarines
Hobbyist organizations